Garnish may refer to:

 To decorate an object or space by the addition of ornaments
 Garnishment, withholding of one's wages by one's employer to pay one's debt owed to a third party
 Garnish Island, is an island in Glengarriff harbour (County Cork, Ireland) which is a popular tourist attraction.
 Garnish, Newfoundland and Labrador, Canada
 Garnish (fee), a fee paid by a new prisoner to other prisoners upon arrival at a jail
 Garnish (food), a substance used primarily as an embellishment or decoration to a prepared food or drink item
 Cocktail garnish, decorative ornaments that add character or style to a mixed drink
 Garnish, an aspect of military camouflage